Shadow of Darkness (alternatively Sror Morl Anthakal) is a 1989 Cambodian historical drama film written and directed by Yvon Hem. It is the first Cambodian film to be set during the Democratic Kampuchea era, as previous films about the period such as The Killing Fields and Nine Circles of Hell were from foreign countries. The film tells the fictional story of Visal, who survived the tragic execution of his family by the Khmer Rouge and escapes toward Vietnam.

Cast
Thoang Vutha
Pisith Pilika

Accolades
2009 CamboFest
Grabay Meas (Golden Water Buffalo)

References

1989 films
Cambodian drama films
1980s historical drama films
Films set in the 1970s
Khmer-language films
Films about the Cambodian genocide